In Australia, during winter and spring 2001, low rainfall across combined with a hot, dry December created ideal conditions for bushfires. On the day of Christmas Eve, firefighters from the Grose Vale Rural Fire Service (RFS) brigade attended a blaze in rugged terrain at the end of Cabbage Tree Rd, Grose Vale, believed to have been caused by power lines in the Grose Valley.

On Christmas Day, strong westerly winds fuelled more than 100 bushfires across the state, creating a plume of smoke that extended across Sydney. This plume of smoke would not clear for some days as the bushfires continued to burn, creating some of the worst pollution that Sydney has ever experienced, with a regional pollution index reading of: 200 in North-West Sydney; 120 in Central-East and South-West Sydney.
The fires mainly burnt in Lane Cove National Park, the Royal National Park and Blue Mountains National Park. Approximately  was burnt. 121 homes were destroyed across the state and 36 damaged, mostly in the lower Blue Mountains and west of the Royal National Park around Helensburgh. Arsonists were believed to be responsible for starting many of the fires, leading to harsher penalties for those who start bushfires.

The dry conditions that started the bushfires continued well into 2002, resulting in the worst drought in 100 years. The drought was declared a "one in 1000 year event". The drought finally broke with the La Nina event of 2010–2011. Significantly higher than average rainfall began in July 2010, it was Australia's second wettest year on record.

An Erickson S-64 Aircrane helicopter became something of a celebrity during this time. Elvis (N179AC) was loaned to NSW by Victoria and proved instantly successful.

See also
2001 Warragamba bushfires

References

2001 in Australia
Bushfires in New South Wales
2001 fires in Oceania
2002 fires in Oceania
2000s in New South Wales
December 2001 events in Australia
January 2002 events in Australia
2001 disasters in Australia
2002 disasters in Australia